Potassium ferrate is the chemical compound with the formula . This purple salt is paramagnetic, and is a rare example of an iron(VI) compound. In most of its compounds, iron has the oxidation state +2 or +3 ( or ). Reflecting its high oxidation state,  is a powerful oxidizing agent.

Synthesis and structure

Georg Ernst Stahl (1660 – 1734) first discovered that the residue formed by igniting a mixture of potassium nitrate (saltpetre) and iron powder dissolved in water to give a purple solution. Edmond Frémy (1814 – 1894) later discovered that fusion of potassium hydroxide and iron(III) oxide in air produced a compound that was soluble in water:

The composition corresponded to that of potassium manganate. In the laboratory,  is prepared by oxidizing an alkaline solution of an iron(III) salt with concentrated chlorine bleach.:

The poorly soluble barium salt, is also known.

Properties and applications

At high pH, aqueous solutions are stable. The deep purple solutions are similar in appearance to potassium permanganate. It is stronger oxidizing agent than the latter. As a dry solid,  is stable.

Because the side products of its redox reactions are rust-like iron oxides,  has been described as a "green oxidant". It has been employed in waste-water treatment as an oxidant for organic contaminants and as a biocide. Conveniently, the resulting reaction product is iron(III) oxyhydroxide, an excellent flocculant. In organic synthesis,  oxidizes primary alcohols. In contrast, related oxidants such as chromate are considered environmentally hazardous

 has also attracted attention as a potential cathode material in a "super iron battery."

Stabilised forms of potassium ferrate have been proposed for the removal of transuranic species, both dissolved and suspended, from aqueous solutions. Tonnage quantities were proposed to help remediate the effects of the Chernobyl disaster in Belarus. This new technique was successfully applied for the removal of a broad range of heavy metals.

Work on the use of potassium ferrate precipitation of transuranics and heavy metals was carried out in the Laboratories of IC Technologies Inc. in partnership with ADC Laboratories, in 1987 though 1992. The removal of the transuranic species were done on samples from various Dept. of Energy nuclear sites in the USA.

It has been proposed as a bleeding stopper for fresh wounds.

References

Ferrates
Potassium compounds
Oxidizing agents